Chidester may be:

 Brett Chidester, American teen-age suicide and “poster-child”  for Brett’s law on Salvia divinorum
 Chidester, Arkansas